Fateh (meaning "conqueror") is an Iranian designed class of semi-heavy submarines. The Iranian media reported that Fateh class subs can operate more than 200 meters below the sea surface for nearly five weeks.

History
In September 2013, the Iranian Navy announced that the first sub of this class would be launched by the end of the current Iranian year (in March 2014), according to satellite imagery the first sub of the class was launched in 2013 and a second one is under construction at the Bandar Anzali Naval Base on the Caspian Sea.

In 2019 the Islamic Republic News Agency reported that the Fateh had joined Iran's fleet after final tests, in a ceremony attended by Iranian president Hassan Rouhani.  It reported that the Fateh is "equipped with sonar, electric drive, combined battle management, surface-to-surface guided missile guidance, torpedo guidance, electronic and telecommunication warfare, secure and integrated telecommunication systems and dozens of state-of-the-art modern systems.  Fateh submarine has surface speed of 11 knots (20.35 km/h) and is capable of travelling submerged at 14 knots (25.9 km/h). The submarine is armed with four 533-mm torpedoes; it can carry eight sea mines and two reserve torpedoes."

On January 13, 2021, Fateh demonstrated its capability to fire torpedoes during the Eqtedar Naval Exercise.

Submarines in the class

See also

 List of submarine classes in service
 List of naval ship classes of Iran
 List of military equipment manufactured in Iran

References

Submarine classes of the Islamic Republic of Iran Navy